Bixega is one of 15 parishes (administrative divisions)  in Belmonte de Miranda, a municipality within the province and autonomous community of Asturias, in northern Spain. 

Villages
 Bixega
 El Pontigu
 Santa Marina
 El Valle
 Viḷḷaverde

References

Parishes in Belmonte de Miranda